Jalan Kledang, Federal Route 317, is a federal road in Perak, Malaysia. It is a main route to Kledang Hill from Menglembu.

The Kilometre Zero is located at Menglembu.

At most sections, the Federal Route 317 was built under the JKR R5 road standard, with a speed limit of 90 km/h.

List of junctions

References

Malaysian Federal Roads